Keekle is a hamlet in Cumbria, England.
The River Keekle flows past the eastern edge of the settlement.

Hamlets in Cumbria
Borough of Copeland